LM was a short-lived publication from Newsfield, the publishers of computer gaming titles such as Crash! for the ZX Spectrum and Zzap!64 for the Commodore 64. Issue 1 was launched in February 1987 and ran for four editions, although a preview issue 0 was given away with the Christmas 1986 editions of Crash, Zzap! and Amtix.

The meaning of the name LM was never officially revealed to the public, though it was variously said to be short for Leisure Magazine, Leisure Monthly, or the pseudonymous Lloyd Mangram, under whose name copy frequently appeared in both Crash! and Zzap64!.  Its target demographic was male, and in the 18-30 age range; this was a segment that Heat would attempt to target at its launch in 1999 (also without success), before repositioning itself.

It was a bold move for Newsfield, who had been successful in the computing sector. While the magazine was met with great enthusiasm amongst its readers, advertising revenue became increasingly hard to secure, as partners felt it wasn't projecting the image they had hoped for, nor in the numbers expected.  In the face of such losses,  Newsfield's limited financial resources could not support a setup requiring a large editorial team with both London and Shropshire offices. The magazine ceased publication after four issues.

In tone, the magazine borrowed some of the irreverent in-house style of both Crash! and Zzap!64, and had a wide coverage of popular culture such as books, games, TV, movies, and music in a way that would become more common with the launch of magazines such as Loaded nearly a decade later.

References

1986 establishments in the United Kingdom
1987 disestablishments in the United Kingdom
Defunct computer magazines published in the United Kingdom
Magazines established in 1986
Magazines disestablished in 1987